Framlingham College is a public school (private boarding and day school) in the town of Framlingham, near Woodbridge, Suffolk, England. Together with its preparatory school and nursery at Brandeston Hall, it serves pupils from 3 to 18 years of age.

History 

Framlingham College, originally called the Albert Middle Class College in Suffolk, was founded in 1864 by public subscription as the Suffolk County Memorial to Queen Victoria's husband, Albert, Prince Consort, and was incorporated by Royal Charter. The individuals most involved in setting up of the school were Sir Edward Kerrison, 2nd Baronet, Richard Garrett and the Earl of Stradbroke. The land on which the college was built was originally part of the Castle estate, left by Sir Robert Hitcham in 1636 to Pembroke Hall, Cambridge. The architect was Fredrick Peck of Furnival's Inn, London. Built to accommodate 300 boys, the college opened its doors to pupils on 10 April 1865.

In J. R. de S. Honey's book Tom Brown's Universe: Public School in the Nineteenth Century, he reviewed the 64 leading public schools of the time and considered Framlingham as interacting less than it should with other leading schools.

In 1940, because of Framlingham's position close to the Suffolk coast, considered a likely site for a possible German invasion, and as a result of the crisis unfolding at Dunkirk, pupils from the college were evacuated for a short time to Repton School in Derbyshire.

The college's prep school at Brandeston Hall was opened by Princess Alice, Countess of Athlone in July 1949. The hall had been purchased and restored by the Society of Old Framlinghamians as a memorial to those of their number who died in the world wars.

The school 

Louise North became principal of Framlingham College and Head of the Senior School in September 2019. She was formerly Senior Deputy Head at Oakham School, Rutland. The school received an excellent ISI Inspection Report in February 2015 and an Outstanding Ofsted report in February 2011.

Pupils are accommodated in seven boarding and day houses: three for girls and four for boys. The facilities at Framlingham College include a theatre with tiered seating for 250, a design and technology centre, a music department including various studios and recording facilities, a library, a sixth-form centre which opened in 2014, a leisure centre that houses an indoor swimming pool, a fitness suite and weights room. The original library, which was given to the college by Charles H. Berners in 1899, was extended in 1998.

The school has two campuses situated on approximately 135 acres. Between the college and Framlingham Castle lies the 34-acre Framlingham Mere, a nature reserve owned by the college and managed by Suffolk Wildlife Trust. The prep school campus at Brandeston Hall is a mock Tudorbethan hall set in its own grounds, facing the medieval All Saints' Church, Brandeston.

Sport 

Framlingham College campus includes an indoor swimming pool, multi-gym, weights room and large playing fields. Other facilities include a modern sports hall; two floodlit artificial hockey pitches; an indoor rifle range; tennis, netball and squash courts; and a golf course. Home matches for golf are played at Aldeburgh Golf Club. The cricket square hosted an England XI in 2010. Framlingham College featured in The Cricketer magazine's Top 100 Cricketing Schools for 2016. The major sports are rugby, hockey, cricket, athletics and tennis for boys, and hockey, netball and tennis for girls. The girls also have a cricket team and have an annual fixture against the MCC.  Pupils can also take part in golf, squash, football, badminton, athletics, basketball, swimming, archery, shooting, canoeing, table tennis, and equestrian.

List of Heads 

 1864–1871 A. C. Daymond
 1872–1881 W. W. Bird
 1881–1886 A. H. Scott-White
 1887–1913 O. D. Inskip
 1913–1929 F. W. Stocks
 1929–1940 W. H. A. Whitworth
 1941–1955 R. W. Kirkman
 1955–1971 W. S. Porter
 1971–1989 L. I. Rimmer
 1989–1994 J. F. X. Miller
 1994–2009 G. M. Randall
 2009–2019 Mike Oxlong
 2019– J. L. M. North.

In the media 

Framlingham College was the subject of a Channel 4 documentary called Classmates in 2003. The buildings and interiors of Framlingham College were used in series 2 of the BBC comedy Detectorists, first broadcast in November 2015.

Notable Old Framlinghamians 

 Charles Alderton: American pharmacist, and the creator of the carbonated soft drink Dr Pepper.
 Brian Aldiss, OBE, Science fiction author
 Norman Borrett, Schoolmaster and accomplished sportsman. Described by the Times as "arguably Britain's most talented post-war all-round amateur sportsman".
 David Bull, television presenter (The Wright Stuff, Most Haunted Live) Brexit Party MEP
 Alain de Cadenet, former racing driver and television presenter
 Herbert St Maur Carter, Royal Army Medical Corps surgeon decorated by the British and Serbian governments
 Ashley Cowan, former Essex County Cricket Club cricketer
 Valentine Crittall, 1st Baron Braintree, MP
 Stanley Dance, biographer of Duke Ellington, record producer
 George Sampson Elliston, Conservative MP for Blackburn, Member of the Corporation of London
 Len Evans, 'Godfather of Australian Wine'
 Andrew Freemantle, chief executive of RNLI
 William Hale-White, Guy's physician; writer of Materia Medica (1895)
 William Bate Hardy, renowned biologist and physiologist, Vice President of the Royal Society
 Arthur Vere Harvey, Baron Harvey of Prestbury, MP
 Mark Hedley, High Court Judge
 Sao Hkun Hkio, The Sawbwa of Mongmit, Burma
 Patrick Howard-Dobson, Vice Chief of the Defence Staff, President of the Royal British Legion
 Christina Johnston, soprano with the Prague State Opera
Prince Constantin Karadja, Romanian diplomat and Righteous Among the Nations
 David Larter, Northamptonshire & England cricketer
 Alistair Cooke, Baron Lexden, Conservative historian and politician
 Walter Miecznikowski, English football player
 Alfred James Munnings, (1878–1959), artist
 Rob Newton, Northamptonshire County Cricket Club cricketer
 Keito Okamoto, Japanese singer and member of the group Hey! Say! JUMP
 James Paice, Conservative MP 1987–2015, Minister of State at the Department for Environment, Food and Rural Affairs 2010–2012
 Percy Charles Pickard, World War II pilot and leader of Operation Jericho
 Henry Pryce Jackman, composer
 Barry Purves, Academy Award-nominated animator, director and screenwriter
 Stuart Rossiter, writer and postal historian
 Peter Rodulfo, artist and sculptor
 Charlie Simpson, musician, Busted and Fightstar
 Imogen Slaughter, actress
 Harry George Smart, Commander, British Forces in Iraq
 Jeremy Sullivan, Lord Justice of Appeal and Senior President of Tribunals 
 William Vale
 William Robertson Warren, Prime Minister of Newfoundland
 Laura Wright, singer and former member of All Angels
 Ivor Noël Hume, archaeologist
 Kenneth Mayhew, World War II veteran, decorated with the highest honour of the Kingdom of the Netherlands
 The Wizard of New Zealand (Ian Brackenbury Channel), New Zealand icon and educator
 Tim Inskip, British Indian Army major-general and cricketer

Victoria Cross and George Cross recipients 

Three Old Framlinghamians have won the Victoria Cross, and one the George Cross (converted from the Albert Medal).

Recipients of the Victoria Cross 

 Gordon Muriel Flowerdew (1885–1918). Awarded for a cavalry charge in March 1918, in France in the First World War, from which he died of his wounds the following day. This was the last British cavalry charge in military history.
 William Henry Hewitt (1885–1966). Awarded for an attack on a pillbox in September 1917.
 Augustus Willington Shelton Agar, RN (1890–1968). Awarded for an attack on the Russian Navy in June 1919 at Kronstadt, Russia, in the North Russia Campaign.

Recipients of the George Cross 

 Henry De Beauvoir Tupper. Awarded the Albert Medal (later replaced by the George Cross) on 21 February 1919, for gallantry in saving lives at sea on 4 August 1918  while serving on  during World War I.

References

External links 

 Framlingham College official website
 Old Framlinghamian official website
 Profile on the ISC website

Boarding schools in Suffolk
Member schools of the Headmasters' and Headmistresses' Conference
Private schools in Suffolk
Educational institutions established in 1864
Church of England private schools in the Diocese of St Edmundsbury and Ipswich
Framlingham
1864 establishments in England